The sumui (flute) is one of the most ancient and commonly played instruments in the musical tradition of Tripura. Sumui, is the most perfect and least mechanical of all the instruments. It is made of bamboo. There are two types of sumui, one having 7 (seven) holes and the other having 8 (eight) hole. Mostly found are two manipulator characteristic features:

a) Those held along the mouth

b) Those held across the mouth

Construction
Sumui is made of the hollow stem of a bamboo. The instrumentalist himself cuts the bamboo to a suitable length and putting the bamboo to his lips in a playing position determines the distances of the flute stops by simply putting his fingers to the position marking the places where the two fingers nearest to a bamboo node come down. The distance between them becomes the standard length and on ascertaining the whole position the marked areas are burned with a hot iron nail. In the final stage, a separate mark is scratched carefully in alignment with the stop-hole near the upper rim, at a distance of one finger-width for a rectangular notch, gradually sloped as per thickness of the stem. The marked area is cut with a knife.

See also
Bansuri
Venu
 Tripuri people
Sarinda
Tripuri Dances
Musical instruments of Tripura

Indian musical instruments